Stefano Pellegrini may refer to:

 Stefano Pellegrini (footballer, born 1953) (1953–2018), Italian footballer with Roma and Avellino in the 1970s
 Stefano Pellegrini (footballer, born 1967), Italian footballer with Sampdoria, Roma and Udinese in the 1980s and 1990s